Bogdan Ioan Andone (born 7 January 1975) is a Romanian football manager and former professional player.

After spending most of his career in the Romanian first division, Andone then moved to Hungary and Cyprus. He played for many clubs, including FC Brașov, Rapid, Farul Constanța, Oțelul Galați, Ferencvárosi TC, Apollon Limassol and Alki Larnaca.

Coaching career

FCSB
On 5 June 2019, Andone was appointed as the new head coach of Liga I powerhouse FCSB.He resigned from his position on 1 August after a 2–3 defeat against Armenian side FC Alashkert in the Europa League second qualifying round.

Astra Giurgiu
On 10 October 2019, Andone was appointed as the new head coach of Liga I club Astra Giurgiu.

Career statistics

Managerial statistics

Honours

Player
Rapid București 
 Divizia A: 1998–99
Ferencvárosi TC 
 Hungarian Cup: 2002–03
Apollon Limassol
 Cypriot First Division: 2005–06
 Cypriot Super Cup: 2006
Ermis Aradippou
 Cypriot Second Division: 2008–09

References

External links
Profile at RomanianSoccer.ro
 

1975 births
Living people
People from Aiud
Romanian footballers
Association football midfielders
Liga I players
Liga II players
CS Corvinul Hunedoara players
FC Sportul Studențesc București players
FC Brașov (1936) players
FC Rapid București players
FCV Farul Constanța players
ASC Oțelul Galați players
Nemzeti Bajnokság I players
Ferencvárosi TC footballers
Cypriot First Division players
Cypriot Second Division players
Apollon Limassol FC players
Alki Larnaca FC players
Ermis Aradippou FC players
Romanian expatriate footballers
Expatriate footballers in Cyprus
Romanian expatriate sportspeople in Cyprus
Expatriate footballers in Hungary
Romanian expatriate sportspeople in Hungary
Romanian football managers
FC Voluntari managers
FC Olimpia Satu Mare managers
SSU Politehnica Timișoara managers
FC Metaloglobus București managers
ACS Viitorul Târgu Jiu managers
FC Steaua București managers
FC Astra Giurgiu managers
Apollon Limassol FC managers
FC Steaua București assistant managers
FC Rapid București assistant managers